Eslamabad (also Romanized as Eslāmābād) is a village in Alvand Rural District, in the Central District of Khorramdarreh County, Zanjan Province, Iran. At the 2006 census, its population was 96, in 21 families.

References 

Populated places in Khorramdarreh County